Gilberto da Silva Melo (born 25 April 1976), more commonly known as Gilberto, is a Brazilian former professional footballer. He played at left-back for the majority of his career. Gilberto's brothers Nenei and Nélio are also former footballers.

Club career
Born in Rio de Janeiro, Gilberto started his career in his native Brazil, playing for América-RJ, Flamengo and Cruzeiro. He moved for one season to Italian club Internazionale. However, he soon left for Vasco da Gama. He also played with Grêmio and São Caetano.

Hertha BSC
Gilberto returned to Europe in 2004 with Hertha BSC.

He played four years at this club. Gilberto combined a successful defense with permanent participation in the attacks from the left winger position. He had fast speed and good shot, and often threatened the goal, scoring six goals at the first season as a left back. In the first two seasons of his Berlin career Hertha finished fourth in 2004–05 and the following season finished sixth.

Tottenham Hotspur
Gilberto signed for Tottenham Hotspur from Hertha on 31 January 2008. After an initial period out injured, he made his Spurs debut against PSV in the UEFA Cup on 6 March 2008, but was replaced by Jamie O'Hara at half-time, after he had made a mistake that allowed PSV to score the game's only goal. Spurs manager Juande Ramos stated after the match that Gilberto was substituted not because of the error, but rather because he is still recovering from his calf injury. Nevertheless, in playing, he became the first Brazilian to play for Spurs at first-team level, with their previous Brazilian players Rodrigo Defendi and Diego Bortolozzo only featuring in the reserve team. In Spurs' next game, Gilberto came on as a substitute to score the team's third goal in a 4–0 win over West Ham United in the Premier League. Gilberto played his first full Spurs match against Bolton Wanderers at White Hart Lane on 26 April 2008.

Gilberto only made three appearances for Spurs in the 2008–09 season. He started a league game against Portsmouth and a UEFA Cup tie with Spartak Moscow. He was substituted at half time in both games. His last appearance for Spurs came against Shakhtar Donetsk in the UEFA Cup on 26 February 2009.

Cruzeiro
On 17 July 2009, Brazilian club Cruzeiro announced Gilberto will sign a two-year contract after a medical. Tottenham Hotspur announced his contract was mutually terminated on 24 July. He was unveiled to press on 29 July after the medical on the same day.

He confirmed that he had quit the team during the season after ongoing discord among fans and the other squad members, and the club terminated his contract on 20 September 2011.

Vitoria
On 26 September 2011, Gilberto signed for the Campeonato Brasileiro Série B side Esporte Clube Vitória until the end of the season.

International career
In 1998 was the first time that Gilberto had training with the national team, after a successful season. He played for Brazil in the 2006 FIFA World Cup in Germany and scored against Japan in the group stage, his first goal for the national side, having made his debut for the team against Nigeria on 11 June 2003. Gilberto also featured as Brazil's first choice left back in the Copa America 2007. Due to club performance, he lost his place on the national team to Kléber, and then to André Santos, which both of them selected to 2009 FIFA Confederations Cup and left Gilberto out. However, he has been called up in February 2010 to a friendly match against Republic of Ireland since returned to Brazil. But he played as unused bench as Michel Bastos's backup.

Moreover, most of the 22-men squad for the Ireland match (except Adriano and Carlos Eduardo), plus Elano, Luís Fabiano (who both pull out from the friendly by injury) and Heurelho Gomes, became the provisional 23-men squad for the 2010 FIFA World Cup. And 7 more players were call-up as backup players. He played twice for the Seleção at the tournament, both as sub, including the match losing to the Netherlands in the quarter-finals. After the dismiss of Dunga, he never received any call-up again, and one year later, in 2011 he retired from the international football.

Career statistics

International

Score and result list Brazil's goal tally first, score column indicates score after Gilberto goal.

Honours
Flamengo
 Campeonato Carioca: 1996
 Copa de Oro: 1996

Cruzeiro
 Minas Gerais State Championship: 1998, 2011

Vasco da Gama
 Campeonato Brasileiro Série A: 2000
 Copa Mercosur: 2000

São Caetano
 Campeonato Paulista: 2004
Brazil
 FIFA Confederations Cup: 2005
 Copa América: 2007
 Lunar New Year Cup: 2005

References

External links

1976 births
Living people
Brazilian footballers
Association football fullbacks
Association football midfielders
Association football utility players
Brazil international footballers
2003 FIFA Confederations Cup players
2005 FIFA Confederations Cup players
2006 FIFA World Cup players
2007 Copa América players
FIFA Confederations Cup-winning players
2010 FIFA World Cup players
Copa América-winning players
America Football Club (RJ) players
CR Flamengo footballers
CR Vasco da Gama players
Cruzeiro Esporte Clube players
Grêmio Foot-Ball Porto Alegrense players
Associação Desportiva São Caetano players
Hertha BSC players
Inter Milan players
Tottenham Hotspur F.C. players
Esporte Clube Vitória players
América Futebol Clube (MG) players
Araxá Esporte Clube players
Campeonato Brasileiro Série A players
Campeonato Brasileiro Série B players
Serie A players
Bundesliga players
Premier League players
Brazilian expatriate footballers
Brazilian expatriate sportspeople in Italy
Expatriate footballers in Italy
Brazilian expatriate sportspeople in Germany
Expatriate footballers in Germany
Brazilian expatriate sportspeople in England
Expatriate footballers in England
Footballers from Rio de Janeiro (city)